Stęszew  (1939-1945: Seenbrück) is a town in western Poland, with 5,248 inhabitants (2004). It is located in Poznań County, within the Greater Poland Voivodeship.

History

Stęszew was once an important stop in a trade route from Silesia. In 1370 king Casimir III the Great granted the settlement city rights. It was a private town of Polish nobility, administratively located in the Poznań County in the Poznań Voivodeship in the Greater Poland Province of the Polish Crown. The town developed rapidly until the Swedish Deluge and Seven Years' War. Eventually, in 1793, Stęszew became part of the Prussian Partition of Poland after the Second Partition of Poland. In 1799 the town was sold by Countess Dorota Jabłonowska to Prince William I of the Netherlands. From 1807 to 1815 the town was part of the short-lived Polish Duchy of Warsaw. From 1922 the town was within the Polish Poznań Voivodeship.

Following the joint German-Soviet invasion of Poland, which started World War II in September 1939, the town was under German occupation. Local Polish people were expelled or forced into labor and concentration camps. Four Poles from Stęszew were also murdered by the Russians in the large Katyn massacre in April–May 1940. The liberation of Stęszew and neighbouring villages took place in January 1945.

Sport
The town's most notable sports club is Lipno Stęszew with football and field hockey sections.

References

Cities and towns in Greater Poland Voivodeship
Poznań County
Poznań Voivodeship (1921–1939)